John Deacon (born 1951) is the former bassist of the rock band Queen.

John Deacon may also refer to:

John Deacon (motorcyclist) (1962–2001)
John Deacon, wrongly convicted of arson, whose story was shown in Flashover (film)
John Deacon, Chairman of Portsmouth F.C.

See also
John the Deacon (disambiguation), several mediaeval writers
Deacon John (disambiguation)